Poplar Chapel AME Church was a historic African Methodist Episcopal church in Rayville, Louisiana.  Located on Louisiana Highway 135, it was built in 1903.  It was added to the National Register in 1989.

It was a four bay basilica style church with vaguely Queen Anne Revival and Romanesque Revival style influences. It was deemed notable "as a rare survivor of a vernacular archetype".

However, the chapel has been destroyed.

References

Methodist churches in Louisiana
Churches on the National Register of Historic Places in Louisiana
Churches completed in 1903
Buildings and structures in Richland Parish, Louisiana
National Register of Historic Places in Richland Parish, Louisiana